Sell This House is an American reality television series that premiered July 6, 2003 on A&E and May 18, 2020 on FYI. Host Tanya Memme and home stagers/interior designers Roger Hazard and Daniel Kucan help homeowners who are having trouble selling their houses. For its ninth season, the show's name was changed to Sell This House: Extreme and the format expanded to one hour, with the materials budget increased from $2,000 to $20,000. Construction expert Charlie Frattini and designer Daniel Kucan joined the cast after Hazard departed the show.

Premise

2003-2011
In seasons 1 through 9, cameras were set up to record prospective buyers' reactions in a one-day open house, followed by Memme showing and discussing the comments with the homeowners. Afterward, Hazard makes his evaluation. He, Memme, the sellers, and their friends and family then work to stage the house, fixing, minimizing or hiding any problems he has found, working with a budget of a few hundred dollars. This generally involves redesigning the landscaping, painting, removing excess clutter and personal items and staging furnishings without making structural changes to the house. Finally, the same potential buyers are brought back for a second walkthrough.

2020-present
In May 2020, A+E Networks announced the series would be returning for its tenth season after a nearly nine-year hiatus. Season 10 premiered on May 18, 2020, on FYI and many free streaming services. The latest season focuses on houses that have been sitting on the market for more than 100 days. Memme starts by conducting an open house to get feedback from buyers, before working with a local designer to transform the homes. After relisting the homes online and conducting a new round of open house inspections, viewers see the transformation, hear prospective buyer feedback, and find out for what price the home listed and if it sold.

Series overview

References

External links

 

2000s American reality television series
2010s American reality television series
2020s American reality television series
2003 American television series debuts
A&E (TV network) original programming
English-language television shows
Television shows set in the United States
Home renovation television series
Property buying television shows
FYI (American TV channel) original programming
American television series revived after cancellation